Tayac is a commune in the Gironde department in Nouvelle-Aquitaine in southwestern France.

Population

See also
Communes of the Gironde department

Sport
Tayac is famous for Motorcycle racing. It has held both International Grasstrack and Longtrack meetings. In 2017 it hosted the European Grasstrack Sidecar Final and in 2018 the European Grasstrack Solos Final.

References

Communes of Gironde